Lee Moyer is an American painter, illustrator, graphic designer, and web designer. Notable works include posters for musicians Tori Amos and Melissa Auf der Maur, as well as Laurel and Hardy paintings for the covers of their DVD box set collections, and the cover for the documentary Lovecraft: Fear of the Unknown.

Biography

Early life and career
Moyer's early work was in watercolor and oils. He worked for ten years as a Docent and Naturalist Illustrator at the Smithsonian Museum of Natural History.

In 1989, he changed his focus to digital art, becoming an early adopter of Photoshop and selling his Magic: The Gathering collection to buy his first Apple computer.

He spent the early years of his career on the East Coast as Executive Producer at Digital Addiction and later an Art Director at Electronic Arts.

Moyer first worked with artist Michael Wm. Kaluta while working on a music video for the Alan Parsons Project's Don't Answer Me. In 2009, Kaluta and author Elaine Lee hired Moyer as colorist on their comic book series Starstruck. IDW released a remastered edition of the work that featured expanded art by Kaluta, and Moyer's new color art and designs. Moyer also colored the cover of the original cast recording Starstruck audio play CD from The AudioComics Company.

Gaming industry 
Moyer produced Dungeons & Dragons interior art from 2004-2013, including: Eberron Campaign Setting, Stormwrack, Player's Handbook, Dungeon Master's Guide, Draconomicon, and Martial Power.

He worked with game designer Keith Baker on the board game "The Doom That Came To Atlantic City". The project was mired in production problems that resulted in a Federal Trade Commission investigation that became the first federal crowdfunding prosecution. The game was published by Cryptozoic Entertainment in July 2013.

Moyer was the lead illustrator for "13th Age" and its expansion "13 True Ways".

Notable works 

Moyer painted The 2012 Literary Pin-Up Calendar for the charity Worldbuilders, which donates proceeds to Heifer International. It featured illustrations of classic authors. Another calendar was published in 2013 featuring modern fantasy authors. Moyer said that he enjoyed creating the works while "...riffing on the style of pin-up great George Petty."

In 2019, at the KEEP Contemporary Art Gallery in Santa Fe, NM, he helped create portraits of authors Seanan McGuire, Neil Gaiman, Octavia Butler, and N.K. Jemisin.

Bibliography

Book covers

 Seanan McGuire. Imaginary Numbers. DAW, 2020. Tricks for Free. DAW, 2018. 
 Joe Haldeman. The Best of Joe Haldeman. Subterranean Press, 2013.
 Caitlín R. Kiernan. Confessions of a Five-Chambered Heart. Subterranean Press, 2012. Two Worlds and In Between: The Best of Caitlín R. Kiernan (Volume One). Subterranean Press, 2011.
 Tad Williams. A Stark and Wormy Knight. Subterranean Press, 2012. 
 Mark Hodder. A Red Sun Also Rises. Pyr, 2012. 
 Michael Bishop. The Door Gunner and Other Perilous Flights of Fancy. Subterranean Press, 2011. 
 Kim Newman. Mysteries of the Diogenes Club. MoneyBrain Books, 2010. Secret Files of the Diogenes Club. MonkeyBrain Books, 2007
 Jake McDevitt. Cryptic: The Best Short Fiction of Jack McDevitt. Subterranean Press, 2009. 
 Philip José Farmer. Two Hawks From Earth. MonkeyBrain Books, 2009.
 Michael Swanwick. The Postutopian Adventures of Darger & Surplus Subterranean Press, 2020. The Best of Michael Swanwick. Subterranean Press, 2008. A Geography of Unknown Lands. Tigereye Press, 1997.
 Edgar Pangborn. Davy. Old Earth Books, 2004.
 Iain M. Banks. The Algebraist. Night Shade Books, 2004.

Comics

 Starstruck: Remastered (IDW): color and design 
  Starstruck: The Expanding Universe (Dark Horse): preface
 Galactic Girl Guides (IDW): color
 Starstruck Deluxe Edition, 2011 (IDW): color and design 
 Aquaman #51 (DC) cover color
 Zauriel #1 (DC) cover color
 Eberron: Eye of the Wolf (Devil's Due) cover color
 Honey West #3, 4, and 5. (Moonstone) cover
 Buckaroo Banzai: Return Of The Screw and Buckaroo Banzai: Origins cover
 Axe Cop: President of the World #1 (Dark Horse) cover color

References

External links
 Lee Moyer Official website
  Deviant Art: Starstruck, Kaluta and Moyer
 
 13th Age – My D & D Next: An interview with Rob Heinsoo, Jonathan Tweet and Lee Moyer, Obskures, December 17, 2012. Retrieved June 9, 2013.
 Work Inspiration with Lee Moyer - Interview on Workspiration.org
  - Interview with Albany Theater

American comics artists
American graphic designers
American illustrators
American speculative fiction artists
Comics colorists
Fantasy artists
Hugo Award-winning artists
Living people
Role-playing game artists
Science fiction artists
Web designers
Year of birth missing (living people)